Stay Awake is the debut album from Middian and Yob lead-vocalist Mike Scheidt. It was released in June 2012 under Thrill Jockey records.

Track listing

References

Thrill Jockey albums
2012 debut albums